Caput Stenarum was a fort in the Roman province of Dacia in the 2nd century AD. It is located 700 m east of the village Boița in Romania.

See also
List of castra

External links
Roman castra from Romania - Google Maps / Earth

Notes

Roman legionary fortresses in Romania
Ancient history of Transylvania
Historic monuments in Sibiu County